The Schenectady Blue Jays baseball club was an American minor league baseball franchise based in Schenectady, New York, for 12 consecutive seasons, 1946–57.  It was a member of the Class C Canadian–American League through 1950, and the Class A Eastern League thereafter.  The Blue Jays were affiliated with Major League Baseball's Philadelphia Phillies and played at McNearney Stadium from the middle of 1946 through their final season.<ref name="pudc">[http://www.dailygazette.net/standard/ShowStoryTemplate.asp?Path=SCH/2012/06/24&ID=Ar04401&Section=Life_and_Arts The Daily Gazette"], Schenectady, New York</ref>

Franchise history
The Blue Jays were founded at the beginning of the post-World War II boom in minor league baseball.  Schenectady had previously been represented by a team in the Negro leagues, the Mohawk Giants (1913–1914), and by the Schenectady Electricians and Schenectady Frog Alleys of the New York State League (1895–1904) and the Eastern Association (1909).

The Phillies, purchased during the war by the R. R. M. Carpenter family, began to build out their farm system in 1946 and added Schenectady to their roster of affiliates.  The nickname Blue Jays'' became the Phillies' secondary moniker before the start of the 1944 season and was common to at least two other Philadelphia farm teams, the Class C Salina Blue Jays and Class D Green Bay Blue Jays. The 1946 Schenectady Jays finished seventh in the eight-team Can-Am League. But the 1947 edition, managed by Leon Riley, father of future National Basketball Association player, coach and executive Pat Riley, won the league pennant by 13 games and the playoff championship; it drew over 146,000 fans, almost 60,000 more than the second-most-popular Can-Am League team.

After the 1950 season, the Phillies replaced their Eastern League affiliate, the Utica Blue Sox, with the Schenectady Blue Jays, who moved up two levels to Class A, which was then almost equivalent to today's Double-A ranking.  Schenectady won the Eastern League championship in 1956 and finished a strong second in 1957, but attendance had fallen to below 60,000 and the Phillies transferred their affiliation to the Williamsport Grays for 1958, thus ending the Blue Jays' 12-year lifespan.

Year-by-year record

Notable alumni
 
Harry Anderson
Ed Bouchee
Don Cardwell
Chuck Essegian
Turk Farrell
Pancho Herrera
Eddie Kasko
Tommy Lasorda
Steve Ridzik
Jack Sanford
Carl Sawatski
Barney Schultz

References

External links
Q&A with Baseball Historian on Schenectady Blue Jays, The Daily Gazette, Schenectady, New York
Information at Baseball Reference
 Finding Aid to Frank Keetz Professional Baseball Collection (includes material on Schenectady Blue Jays), Schenectady County Historical Society.

Schenectady, New York
Defunct Eastern League (1938–present) teams
Defunct baseball teams in New York (state)
Professional baseball teams in New York (state)
Philadelphia Phillies minor league affiliates
Baseball teams established in 1946
Baseball teams disestablished in 1957
1946 establishments in New York (state)
1957 disestablishments in New York (state)
Sports in Schenectady County, New York